The Phelan Building is an 11-story office building located at 760 Market Street in the Financial District of San Francisco, California. It has a triangular shape, similar to the Flatiron Building in Manhattan, New York City, with its tip at the meeting point of Market Street, O’Farrell Street, and Grant Avenue. It is a San Francisco Designated Landmark.

The building was designed by William Curlett and built in 1908 by James D. Phelan on the place of the first, original Phelan Building, damaged by the 1906 earthquake and fire.

The original Phelan Building

The first Phelan Building was constructed in 1881 by James Phelan, the father of James D. Phelan. It was a 6-story, bay-windowed, mansard-roofed flatiron. The architect was John P. Gaynor, who also designed the original Palace Hotel. Despite being advertised as “thoroughly fire and earthquake proof”, the building was badly damaged in the 1906 post-earthquake fire, and its ruins were subsequently dynamited on April 20, 1906.

The second Phelan Building

Work on the new Phelan Building began on October 7, 1907, and was completed on September 1, 1908, for retail stores, and the first day of 1909 for offices. It was one of the earliest office buildings to be rebuilt after the earthquake.

The building's exterior features metal windows and is clad in cream glazed terra-cotta. The original steel structure was designed to accommodate 13 floors; eventually eleven were completed.

At its opening, the building featured an assembly hall on the 11th floor, arcade stores on the second floor, and a basement café. 
For many decades, the Phelan Building was a de facto center for jewelry, hosting dozens of jewelers and a jewelry school.

The penthouse

An unusual feature of the building is a small penthouse. Originally adorned by a rooftop garden, it was used by James D. Phelan to entertain dignitaries. It served as a photography studio in the 1960s, and was abandoned some time in the 1980s.

Major past and current tenants

George Haas & Sons, confectioner. The store was marketed as “the most beautiful candy shop in the country.” Their business also operated a tea room on the second floor.
Medium (website)
Credit Karma
Flexport
Opower

References

External links

Mr. Phelan’s building
The official site
Historical photographs of both Phelan Buildings at the SF Public Library site
The original 1908 brochure

Office buildings in San Francisco
Financial District, San Francisco
Market Street (San Francisco)
Office buildings completed in 1908
San Francisco Designated Landmarks
1900s architecture in the United States
Buildings and structures burned in the 1906 San Francisco earthquake
1908 establishments in California